The "Disgrace of Gijón" is the name given to a 1982 FIFA World Cup football match played between West Germany and Austria at the El Molinón stadium in Gijón, Spain, on 25 June 1982.  The match was the sixth and last game of the first-round Group 2, with the fifth game occurring on the previous day.

Due to the tiebreaker rules in the group stage, a West German win by one or two goals would ensure that both Austria and West Germany advanced to the next round. West Germany scored the only goal in the first 10 minutes of the match, which progressively deteriorated to a virtual halt in the second half.  Despite widespread condemnation and a formal complaint lodged by Algeria – who was consequently eliminated – FIFA ruled that neither team had broken any rules.  West German player Hans-Peter Briegel later admitted the match was fixed.

Following this match, along with similar matches at the previous World Cup in Argentina, FIFA subsequently revised the group system for future tournaments so that the final two games in each group would be played simultaneously. This change made it highly difficult, if not impossible, for teams to engage in match-fixing, since teams would not know what result was required ahead of time.

Background
Note: 2 points for a win, 1 for a draw, first tie-breaker is goal difference.

Algeria began their campaign by recording a surprising 2–1 win over West Germany on the opening day, described as the "greatest World Cup upset since North Korea beat Italy in 1966", and as "one of the biggest shocks in World Cup history". Algeria became the first African or Arab team to defeat a European team at the FIFA World Cup. They then went on to lose 0–2 to Austria before beating Chile 3–2 in their final match. Algeria's victory over Chile made them the first ever African or Arab team to win twice at a World Cup.

As Algeria played that final match the day before West Germany met Austria, the two European teams knew what result they needed in order to qualify for the next round. Any West German win by one or two goals would see both West Germany and Austria qualify based on goal differential tiebreaker. A West German victory by four goals or more would see West Germany and Algeria qualify.  A West German win by exactly three goals would send Austria and Algeria to the next tiebreaker (goals scored), where Austria would need to score at least two goals in defeat to advance in this scenario. West Germany would be eliminated with a loss or draw.

Match

Summary
After ten minutes of furious attack, West Germany succeeded in scoring through a goal by Horst Hrubesch after a cross from the left. After the goal was scored, the team in possession of the ball often passed between themselves in their own half until an opposition player came into the vicinity of the ball, then the ball was passed back to the goalkeeper. Isolated long balls were played into the opposition's half, with little consequence. There were few tackles, and both sets of players flamboyantly missed with apparently no attempt at accuracy whenever they shot on goal. The only Austrian player who seemed to make any effort at livening the game up was Walter Schachner, though he had little success, while one of the few serious attempts on net was made by Wolfgang Dremmler of West Germany.

This performance was widely deplored by all observers. West German ARD commentator Eberhard Stanjek at one point refused to commentate on the game any longer. Austrian commentator Robert Seeger bemoaned the spectacle, and asked viewers to turn off their television sets. George Vecsey, a New York Times journalist, stated that the teams "seemed to work in concert", though added that proving such would be impossible. El Comercio, the local newspaper, printed the match report in its crime section.

Likewise, many spectators were not impressed and voiced their disgust with the players. Chants of "" ("Out, out!"), "" ("Algeria, Algeria!"), and "" ("Let them kiss, let them kiss!", which is commonly used at weddings) were shouted by the Spanish crowd, while angry Algerian supporters waved banknotes at the players. The match was criticized even by the West German and Austrian fans who had hoped for a hot rematch of the 1978 World Cup match, the so-called "Miracle of Córdoba", in which Austria had beaten West Germany; one West German fan burned the national flag in protest.

Details

Aftermath

With West Germany's 1–0 victory, they joined Austria and Algeria with four points in three matches. The teams were separated by goal difference, with West Germany and Austria progressing to the next round of the tournament at the expense of Algeria. The match-fixing saw Austria give up their opportunity to be first in the group (by winning or drawing the match) in exchange for a sure opportunity to advance. The bargaining positions of the two teams were affected by West Germany being in danger of elimination if they failed to win, but also being the better team. By coming second in the group, Austria's second-stage group was France and Northern Ireland. West Germany's opponents were hosts Spain and England who had previously beaten France. Also, for three of the starting players (Horst Hrubesch for West Germany, Josef Degeorgi and Roland Hattenberger for Austria), an additional incentive to avoid aggressive play was that they had been previously booked in their respective teams' first two games. Under the rules then in force, an additional yellow card for any of them in the final group match would have resulted in them serving an automatic one-match ban to start the second round.

After the match, the West German team went back to their hotel where they were met by furious spectators who threw eggs and other projectiles at them; the West Germans returned fire with water bombs. German and Austrian television commentators were so appalled at the match that they urged viewers on live television to stop watching the match and watch something else. The Algerian football officials lodged an official protest. In addition, the president of the Algerian Football Federation opined that referee Bob Valentine should have intervened and his failure to do so was worthy of complaint. However, FIFA considered that no rules were broken as a result of the match, and declined to take any action. Both teams denied any collusion during the match. West Germany manager Jupp Derwall defended his team from the criticism, pointing out that Uli Stielike and Karl-Heinz Rummenigge were both unfit. The West Germans made it to the final, where they lost to Italy 3–1. Austria fell at the next group stage, to the benefit of eventual fourth-place finishers France.

As a result of the game, from the World Cup 1986 onward, the final pair of group matches in World Cups always start at the same time.

Later journalists have taken another look at the match, wondering if claims of "non-aggression" are exaggerated. In The Irish Times, Rob Smyth wrote that "The 10 minutes after Hrubesch’s goal would even be described as exhilarating in some cultures, with Wolfgang Dremmler forcing a fine save from Friedrich Koncilia (the second and final shot on target in the match) and Paul Breitner missing two good chances. The game slows down towards half-time, principally because the hitherto dominant Germany start to play on the counterattack. Hrubesch would have had a clear shooting chance in the 57th minute had he not hopelessly miscontrolled Felix Magath’s expert chip. As late as the 77th minute, when the game was losing what edge it had, Bernd Krauss broke into the box and forced a desperate clearance from Hans-Peter Briegel. A goal then would have put West Germany out."

Almost 25 years after the World Cup in Spain, former German player Hans-Peter Briegel acknowledged that his team arranged a victory over Austria (1–0) in the first phase, which classified the two teams and eliminated the African team. In an interview for the newspaper 'Al Ittihad', from the United Arab Emirates, Briegel confirmed what everyone suspected since that 25 June 1982 at the El Molinón stadium. "Yes, I apologize for that," said the 51-year-old former Kaiserslautern defender.

See also
 Thailand 3–2 Indonesia, where an Indonesian defender deliberately scored an own goal so his team did not have to face the host Vietnam in the semi-finals of the 1998 Tiger Cup.
 AS Adema 149–0 SO l'Emyrne, where SO l'Emyrne players deliberately scored 149 own goals in protest of refereeing decisions that had gone against them in the previous match.
 Barbados 4–2 Grenada, where a Barbadian defender deliberately scored an own goal so his team could win by two goals in extra-time, according to an unconventional golden goal rule.
 Spain 12–1 Malta, where Spain qualified to Euro 1984 because of a better goal difference than Netherlands. Accusations of match fixing and drugging were made, but not proven.
 Coventry City 2–2 Bristol City, the final match for both sides in the 1977 English First Division. With five minutes remaining, players received news of a Sunderland defeat which meant a draw would save both Coventry and Bristol from relegation. Both sides stopped attempting to score for the final five minutes.

References

External links
 Video highlights of the game on BBC Sport (UK only)

1982 FIFA World Cup
D
1982
1982A
D
Austria–Germany relations
D
Aus
D
1982 controversies
Sport in Gijón
Controversies in Germany
Controversies in Austria
June 1982 sports events in Europe
Nicknamed sporting events